Yiminaspis shenme is a species of primitive arthrodire placoderm from Emsian-aged marine strata in Yunnan, China.  It is closely related to Wuttagoonaspis of Middle Devonian Australia.  Y. shenme is known from a flattened partial skull and portions of the thoracic armor.

Etymology
The genus name translates as "Yi People's shield", deriving from the Chinese name Yímín (an  ethnic group in China, Vietnam, and Thailand) and the Greek word aspis ("a type of round shield"). The specific name is from Chinese shénme, as in "what is it?" reference to the peculiar anatomy of this prehistoric fish.

References

Fossil taxa described in 2008
Wuttagoonaspidae
Placoderms of Asia